Angry Candy is a 1988 collection of short stories by American writer  Harlan Ellison,  loosely organized around the theme of death.  The title comes the last line of the poem "the Cambridge ladies who live in furnished souls" by E. E. Cummings, "...the/ moon rattles like a fragment of angry candy."

The collection contains the short story "Eidolons", which won the 1989 Locus poll award for best short story.  It also contains the novelette "Paladin of the Lost Hour", winner of a Hugo award for best novelette and  later converted by Ellison into an episode of the television series The New Twilight Zone, as well as the short story "Soft Monkey", which won Ellison his second Edgar Award, in 1988.  Angry Candy was nominated for a Bram Stoker Award and won a World Fantasy award for best collection of short stories.

Contents

Introduction: "The Wind Took Your Answer Away"
"Paladin of the Lost Hour"
"Footsteps"
"Escapegoat"
"When Auld's Acquaintance Is Forgot"
"Broken Glass"
"On the Slab"
"Prince Myshkin, and Hold the Relish"
"The Region Between"
"Laugh Track"
"Eidolons"
"Soft Monkey"
"Stuffing"
"With Virgil Oddum at the East Pole"
"Quicktime"
"The Avenger of Death"
"Chained to the Fast Lane in the Red Queen's Racec
"The Function of Dream Sleep"

References

External links
https://web.archive.org/web/20070428100342/http://www.islets.net/collections/candy.html

1988 short story collections
Short story collections by Harlan Ellison
Houghton Mifflin books
World Fantasy Award-winning works